Arkharinsky District  is an administrative and municipal district (raion), one of the twenty in Amur Oblast, Russia. Its administrative center is the urban locality (a work settlement) of Arkhara. Population:  21,068 (2002 Census);  The population of Arkhara accounts for 55.8% of the district's total population.

Geography
There is a wide floodplain by the Amur River in the district, to the northeast there is a terraced lowland plain, followed by the hills and plains of the Arkhara River basin, a tributary of the Amur River. To the north rises the southern end of the Turan Range.

References

Notes

Sources

Districts of Amur Oblast